Pazhur is a village in Chathamangalam Gram Panchayat in Kozhikode district, Kerala, India. It is located near the Eruvayinji Puzha around 4 kilometers away from Mavoor and 25 kilometers away from Kozhikode.

References

Villages in Kozhikode district
Kozhikode east